Ramand District is a district (bakhsh) in Buin Zahra County, Qazvin Province, Iran. At the 2006 census, its population was 18,547, in 5,174 families. The District has one city: Danesfahan.  The District has two rural districts (dehestan): Ebrahimabad Rural District, and Ramand-e Jonubi Rural District.

References 

Districts of Qazvin Province
Buin Zahra County